
Gmina Ciechocin is a rural gmina (administrative district) in Golub-Dobrzyń County, Kuyavian-Pomeranian Voivodeship, in north-central Poland.

Villages
Gmina Ciechocin contains the villages and settlements of Ciechocin, Elgiszewo, Małszyce, Miliszewy, Morgowo, Nowa Wieś, Piotrkowo, Rudaw and Świętosław.

Neighbouring gminas
Gmina Ciechocin is bordered by the gminas of Czernikowo, Golub-Dobrzyń, Kowalewo Pomorskie, Lubicz, Obrowo and Zbójno.

References
Polish official population figures 2006

Ciechocin
Golub-Dobrzyń County